John Noel Tait (born August 14, 1973) is a Canadian former rugby union player.

He played 37 games for Canada. His brother is Luke Tait, who also plays on the Canadian national rugby team.

He is currently the head coach of the Canadian National Senior Women sevens team, and coached the 2016 Canadian Women's 7 team for the 2016 Summer Olympics in Rio.

References

External links
John Tait statistics Scrum.com
John Tait European Cardiff RFC profile 
John Tait European tournament statistics
 

1973 births
Canada international rugby union players
Canadian rugby union coaches
Canadian rugby union players
Living people
People from Orangeville, Ontario
Sportspeople from Ontario
Coaches of international rugby sevens teams